Szymon Symcha Szurmiej (18 June 1923 − 16 July 2014) was a Polish actor, director, and general manager of the Ester Rachel Kamińska and Ida Kamińska State Jewish Theater in Warsaw. He was a director of the Yiddish Theater of Warsaw. Since July 2004, he has been an honorary citizen of Warsaw. Member of the World Jewish Congress.

Biography
Szymon Szurmiej was born on 18 June 1923 in Lutsk, Volhynian Voivodeship as a son of Polish father Jan Szurmiej and Jewish mother, Rebeka (Ryfka) née Biterman. Szurmiej debuted as an actor in 1951 at the Polish Theater in Wrocław. In 1969 he moved to Warsaw, where he has become a general manager of the Jewish Theater.
Szymon Szurmiej was a member and activist of different Jewish organizations in Poland and world.

In 2007 Polish writer Krystyna Gucewicz-Przybora wrote a Szurmiej's biography. Szymon Szurmiej died on 16 July 2014 in Warsaw.

References

External links 

 

1923 births
2014 deaths
Jewish activists
Polish male singers
Jewish Polish male actors
Polish United Workers' Party members
Recipients of the Cross of the Order of Merit of the Federal Republic of Germany
Recipients of the Order of Polonia Restituta
Polish deportees to Soviet Union
Recipient of the Meritorious Activist of Culture badge